Colocolo (from Mapudungun "colocolo", mountain cat) was a Mapuche leader ("cacique lonco") in the early period of the Arauco War. He was a major figure in Alonso de Ercilla y Zúñiga's epic poem La Araucana, about the early Arauco War. In the poem he was the one that proposed the contest between the rival candidates for Toqui that resulted in the choice of Caupolicán. As a historical figure there are some few contemporary details about him. Stories of his life were written long after his lifetime and display many points of dubious historical accuracy.

Mentions in contemporary accounts 
Pedro Mariño de Lobera listed Colocolo as one of the caciques that offered submission to Pedro de Valdivia after the Battle of Penco.   Jerónimo de Vivar in his Chronicle of the Kingdom of Chile (1558), describes Colocolo as one of the Mapuche leaders with 6,000 warriors and one of the competitors for Toqui of the whole Mapuche army following the Battle of Tucapel.  Millarapue also a leader of 6,000 men, but old and not a candidate for the leadership, was the one who persuaded them to quit arguing among themselves and settle the matter with a contest of strength between them which resulted in the victory of Caupolicán who became Toqui.

Lobera later says Colocolo and Peteguelen were the leaders that discovered the advance of the army of Francisco de Villagra and summoned all the people who could fight from the neighboring provinces to oppose the Spanish in the Battle of Marihueñu. He was one of the commanders under Lautaro at the second destruction of Concepción on December 4, 1555. He also lists Colocolo as one of Caupolicán's lieutenants in the Battle of Millarapue against García Hurtado de Mendoza. Lobera also says he was one of the major leaders of the Arauco area to submit to Mendoza after the Battle of Quiapo and the reestablishment of the fortress of San Felipe de Araucan in 1559. He is also said to have given Mendoza warning of the assassination plot of Mecial.

Alonso de Góngora Marmolejo in his History of All the Things that Have happened in the Kingdom of Chile mentions Colocolo in 1561 as a principal leader in Arauco and is said to be a friend until death to the Spanish. He was consulted by Pedro de Villagra about the way to defeat the first outbreak of the second great Mapuche revolt that began that year. It says he advised them to storm a fortress the rebels had built and that such a defeat would end the rebellion. Later, in the following year after Villagra had evacuated the city of Cañete revealing Spanish weakness, Colocolo was prevailed on by the rebellious Mapuche in Arauco to take command of their army. At his order Millalelmo laid siege to the fort of Arauco and other leaders the fort of Los Infantes.

Mentions in later accounts 

Juan Ignacio Molina follows Ercilla's account of Colocolo as the wise elder, in his The Geographical, Natural and Civil History of Chili, Vol. II, (1808). He claims Colocolo was killed in the 1558 Battle of Quiapo.

Other claims 

Claims are Colocolo held the position of "Toqui de la Paz" (Peace Chief) but took over strategic duties when Spanish conquest began, becoming the head of the native Mapuche forces against these invaders. Some others believe his death happened during the great famine and typhus epidemic in 1554–1555.

Modern symbol 
Colocolo, is a symbol of heroic courage, bravery, and wisdom who fought and never surrendered to the Spaniards. Remembered as Ercilla's 60-something elder widely respected by mapuche people, among his captains we can find headchiefs whose names are part of Chile's present geography: Paicaví, Lemo, Lincoyán, Elicura and Orompello, just to name a few.

The most popular Chilean football club, Colo-Colo, was named after this warrior. The Chilean Navy has given its name to several ships throughout history.

References

Sources 
 Jerónimo de Vivar,  Crónica y relación copiosa y verdadera de los reinos de Chile (Chronicle and abundant and true relation of the kingdoms of Chile) ARTEHISTORIA REVISTA DIGITAL; Crónicas de América (on line in Spanish)(History of Chile 1535–1558)
 Alonso de Góngora Marmolejo, Historia de Todas las Cosas que han Acaecido en el Reino de Chile y de los que lo han gobernado (1536-1575) (History of All the Things that Have happened in the Kingdom of Chile and of those that have governed it (1536-1575)), Edición digital a partir de Crónicas del Reino de Chile, Madrid, Atlas, 1960, pp. 75–224, (on line in Spanish)
 Alonso de Ercilla y Zúñiga, La Araucana, eswikisource.
 Pedro Mariño de Lobera, Crónica del Reino de Chile, escrita por el capitán Pedro Mariño de Lobera....reducido a nuevo método y estilo por el Padre Bartolomé de Escobar. Edición digital a partir de Crónicas del Reino de Chile Madrid, Atlas, 1960, pp. 227-562, (Biblioteca de Autores Españoles ; 569-575).  Biblioteca Virtual Miguel de Cervantes (on line in Spanish)
 The Geographical, Natural, and Civil History of Chili by Don Juan Ignatius Molina, Longman, Hurst, Rees, and Orme, Paternoster-Row, London, 1809]

See also
History of Chile
Arauco War
Mapuche

Indigenous leaders of the Americas
16th-century Mapuche people
People of the Arauco War
Lonkos
Characters in La Araucana